Diana Avsaragova   (born August 7, 1998, in Ardon, North Ossetia-Alania) is a Russian mixed martial artist of Ossetian ethnicity who competes in the Women's Flyweight division of the Bellator MMA. As of February 7, 2023, she is #6 in the Bellator Women's Flyweight Rankings.

Background 
Diana was born on August 7, 1998, in Ardon, North Ossetia . Her father was a wrestler, but ended his career early due to an knee injury. Her mother also wanted to go into sports, but her family did not allow her to do so, so when Diana grew up, her mother herself suggested that she take up wrestling. In subsequent years, Avsaragova repeatedly performed at the championships of Moscow (8 times she became the first) and the country, in the division up to 63 kg and below, moreover, both in the junior category and in the adult category. She was even taken to Canada, where the athlete also became a champion. Having given 7 years of her life to wrestling, Diana reached the level of a master of sports, but in the end she realized that this type of martial arts had become boring for her. She trained both in North Ossetia and in Moscow. In the capital, she spent five years in a special boarding house for fighters, and then returned home.

In 2014 and 2015, Diana became the bronze medalist of the Russian championship in freestyle wrestling among girls in the category up to 60 kg.

Mixed martial arts career

Early career
At the Emir Fighting Championship tournament, which took place in December 2017, Jojua fought for the championship belt, and she managed to agree with the organizers to include Avsaragova in the card - everyone was satisfied. The former participant of the wrestling battles was also matched with a debutante, Alina Makarova, who lasted less than two minutes, falling into the armbar. It seemed that such a bright performance promises Diana a bright future, but she soon suffered a knee injury and dropped out of competitive sports until 2019.

After rehabilitation and preparation, Diana performed at the Titan Global Championship, against Anna Lurchenkova, with whom they had a full three-round duel. Having won another victory, the native of Nart got a manager who began to look for interesting offers for her. Some Russian leagues, as well as Invicta FC, considered Avsaragova's candidacy, but due to the pandemic, her next fights were canceled one after another. While training at home and watching what was happening in the world of mixed martial arts, the athlete received a call from her representative who asked if she wanted to fight in Bellator? The answer was yes.

Bellator MMA
In December 2019, she signed a 6-fight contract with Bellator MMA.

In her Bellator debut at Bellator 256 on April 9, 2021, Avsaragova defeated Tara Graff in 29-seconds via knockout.

Avsaragova faced Gabriella Gulfin on July 16, 2021, at Bellator 262. She won the bout via split decision. 4 out of 4 media scores gave it to Diana.

Avsaragova was scheduled to face Ashley Deen on March 12, 2022, at Bellator 276. The week of the event, Deen tested positive for COVID-19 and was replaced by Kyra Batara. Avsaragova won the bout via unanimous decision.

Avsaragova faced Alejandra Lara on February 4, 2023, at Bellator 290. At the weigh-ins, Avsaragova missed weight for her bout, coming in at 128.8 pounds, 2.8 pounds over the flyweight non-title fight limit. The bout proceeded at catchweight and Avsaragova was fined 25% of her purse which went to Lara. Avsaragova won the close bout via split decision. 5 out of 7 media scores gave it to Lara.

Championships and achievements
Freestyle wrestling
2015 Russian cadet nationals 2015 – 3rd (60 kg)

Mixed martial arts record

|-
|Win
|align=center|6–0
|Alejandra Lara
|Decision (split)
|Bellator 290
|
|align=center|3
|align=center|5:00
|Inglewood, California, United States
|
|-
| Win
| align=center|5–0
| Kyra Batara
| Decision (unanimous)
| Bellator 276
| 
|align=center|3
|align=center|5:00
| St. Louis, Missouri, United States
|
|-
| Win
| align=center|4–0
| Gabriella Gulfin
|Decision (split)
| Bellator 262
|
| align=center|3
| align=center|5:00
|Uncasville, Connecticut, United States
|
|-
| Win
| align=center|3–0
| Tara Graff
|KO (punches)
| Bellator 256
|
| align=center|1
| align=center|0:29
|Uncasville, Connecticut, United States
|
|-
| Win
| align=center| 2–0
| Ania Lurchenkova
|Decision (unanimous)
|Titan Global Championship
|
|align=center|3
|align=center|5:00
|Tbilisi, Georgia
|
|-
| Win
| align=center|1–0
| Alina Makarova
| Submission (armbar)
|Emir FC: Selection 1
|
|align=center|1
|align=center|1:57
|Moscow, Russia
|

See also 
 List of current Bellator fighters
 List of female mixed martial artists

References

External links 
 
 

1998 births
Living people
Russian female mixed martial artists
Flyweight mixed martial artists
Mixed martial artists utilizing freestyle wrestling
Bellator female fighters
People from North Ossetia–Alania
Sportspeople from North Ossetia–Alania